Google Plugin for Eclipse (GPE) was a set of development tools that enabled Java developers to design, build, optimize, and deploy cloud computing applications. developers in creating complex user interfaces, generating Ajax code using the GWT Web Toolkit, and deploying applications to Google App Engine. GPE installed into the Eclipse integrated development environment (IDE) using the extensible plugin system.
GPE was available under the Eclipse Public License 1.0.

History
GPE was first released on  April 7, 2009, and the last version 3.9.6 was released on March 31, 2017.
The product was decommissioned in January, 2018.

Release history:
 GPE 1.0 April 7, 2009
 GPE 1.1 July 30, 2009
 GPE 1.2 December 8, 2009
 GPE 1.3 March 16, 2010
 GPE 2.5 December 16, 2011
 GPE 2.6 May 3, 2012
 GPE 3.0 June 29, 2012
 GPE 3.1 August 10, 2012
 GPE 3.2 Feb 13, 2013
 GPE 3.3 July 17, 2013
 GPE 3.4 September 13, 2013
 GPE 3.5 December 20, 2013
 GPE 3.9 March 23, 2016
 GPE 3.9.5 October 24, 2016
 GPE 3.9.6 March 31, 2017

Features 
Support for GWT Web Toolkit
 Development Mode View: inspect your debugging logs and manage the GWT code server from Eclipse
 UiBinder support: template editor with auto-completion, as-you-type validation of template and owner classes, and creation wizard
 Recognition of in-line JavaScript (JSNI): Java reference auto-completion, syntax highlighting, auto-indenting, Java Search and Refactoring integration
 Validation, quick fixes, and refactoring support to keep RPC interfaces in sync
 GWT compiler shortcuts and configuration UI
 Wizards to create modules, client bundles, entry points and HTML pages
 Compatibility with Eclipse for Java EE and projects built with Maven
 Support for GWT JUnit tests

Easy Discovery and Access to Google APIs
 Developers can include features such as Google Maps overlays, Buzz streams, and Google Docs integration in apps via Google APIs.

Import Projects from Project Hosting
 A simple UI that makes importing Google-hosted projects into Eclipse very easy.

One Login, Many Services
 Integrated single sign-on support.

Local Storage APIs
 Enables access to data quickly and continue to be usable offline.

Web Application Wizard
 Create web applications that use GWT Web Toolkit and/or App Engine.

Web Application Launch Configurations
 Run or debug web application locally using fully customizable launch configurations

GWT Designer Integration
 A WYSIWYG Ajax user interface designer

HTML5 Support
 Canvas element that allows for dynamic, scriptable rendering of 2D shapes and bitmap images, and the embedding of Audio/Video tags

CellTable APIs
 Allows for default column sorting and the ability to set column widths

Deployment to Google App Engine
 Real-time validation to ensure that code is compatible with App Engine
 Build projects and enhance JDO classes automatically without the need for Apache Ant

See also 
 GWT Web Toolkit
 Google
 Maven
 Comparison of integrated development environments (IDEs)

References 

Plugin for Eclipse